Defending champion Steffi Graf defeated Monica Seles in the final, 6–2, 6–1 to win the ladies' singles tennis title at the 1992 Wimbledon Championships. It was Graf's fourth Wimbledon singles title and eleventh major title overall, and Seles' best career finish at Wimbledon. Seles was attempting to complete the non-calendar year Grand Slam and career Grand Slam, having won the preceding US Open, Australian Open, and French Open in succession. This would also be the only major match Seles would lose in 1992, thus preventing her from completing the Grand Slam.

Seeds

  Monica Seles (final)
  Steffi Graf (champion)
  Gabriela Sabatini (semifinals)
  Martina Navratilova (semifinals)
  Arantxa Sánchez Vicario (second round)
  Jennifer Capriati (quarterfinals)
  Mary Joe Fernández (third round)
  Conchita Martínez (second round)

  Manuela Maleeva-Fragnière (third round)
  Anke Huber (third round)
  Jana Novotná (third round)
  Katerina Maleeva (quarterfinals)
  Zina Garrison (fourth round)
  Nathalie Tauziat (quarterfinals)
  Kimiko Date (second round)
  Judith Wiesner (third round)

Qualifying

Draw

Finals

Top half

Section 1

Section 2

Section 3

Section 4

Bottom half

Section 5

Section 6

Section 7

Section 8

References

External links

1992 Wimbledon Championships on WTAtennis.com
1992 Wimbledon Championships – Women's draws and results at the International Tennis Federation

Women's Singles
Wimbledon Championship by year – Women's singles
Wimbledon Championships